Judith Méndez Volquez (born July 27, 1981) is a female heptathlete from the Dominican Republic.

Competition record

References

Profile

1981 births
Living people
Dominican Republic heptathletes
Athletes (track and field) at the 2003 Pan American Games
Pan American Games competitors for the Dominican Republic
Dominican Republic female athletes
Central American and Caribbean Games medalists in athletics